Crepuscule with The Dead Science is the third EP from The Dead Science, released in 2006 on Slender Means Society. Two tracks, "Child/Actress" and a cover of John Dowland's "All Ye Whom Love of Fortune", were recorded during the Frost Giant sessions. Thanks in the liner notes is given to "Mr. Zazzary 'Veins' Pendleton", apparently code for Zac Pennington, Slender Means Society's founder.

Track listing
 "Child/Actress"
 "Displacer Beast"
 "ps The Past"
 "White Stain"
 "All Ye Whom Love of Fortune"

External links
 MP3 of "Displacer Beast" (from record label site)
 Slender Means Society (record label)

2006 EPs
The Dead Science albums